These are the official results of the Men's 20 km walk event at the 1994 European Championships in Helsinki, Finland. There were a total number of 29 participating athletes, with the race held on 8 August 1994.

Medalists

Final

Participation
According to an unofficial count, 29 athletes from 16 countries participated in the event.

 (2)
 (1)
 (1)
 (3)
 (2)
 (1)
 (1)
 (3)
 (2)
 (2)
 (1)
 (1)
 (3)
 (2)
 (3)
 (1)

See also
 1990 Men's European Championships 20km Walk (Split)
 1991 Men's World Championships 20km Walk (Tokyo)
 1992 Men's Olympic 20km Walk (Barcelona)
 1993 Men's World Championships 20km Walk (Stuttgart)
 1995 Men's World Championships 20km Walk (Gothenburg)
 1996 Men's Olympic 20km Walk (Atlanta)
 1997 Men's World Championships 20km Walk (Athens)
 1998 Men's European Championships 20km Walk (Budapest)

References

 Results

Walk 20 km
Racewalking at the European Athletics Championships